Galago is a Swedish comics and illustrations magazine published in Sweden. It specializes in alternative comics, and has traditionally had a left-leaning slant.

History and profile
Galago was created in 1979 by Rolf Classon, Olle Berg and Kerold Klang. The magazine was first published by Tago Publishers and later by Atlantic Publishing. The publisher is Ordfront.  It appears with six issues a year. The headquarters is in Stockholm.

The present editor (as of 2020) is Rojin Pertow. With issue 136 Galago celebrated its 40th anniversary in 2019.

References

External links
 Official website

1979 establishments in Sweden
1979 comics debuts
Humor magazines
Magazines established in 1979
Bi-monthly magazines published in Sweden
Comics magazines published in Sweden
Swedish-language magazines
Magazines published in Stockholm